Ron Roy (born April 29, 1940), is an American writer of children's fiction, primarily mysteries for young readers. He is best known for the series A to Z Mysteries (from 1997), Capital Mysteries (from 2001), and Calendar Mysteries (from 2009).

Roy was born in Hartford, Connecticut, grew up in East Hartford, and has lived in Connecticut most of his life. He earned his Bachelor of Arts degree in English from the University of Connecticut and his master's degree in early childhood education from the University of Hartford. He taught fourth grade for ten years until he sold his first book in 1978 and became a full-time writer. His first several books were unpaged picture books.

Selected works

A to Z Mysteries 

The A to Z Mysteries are a series of chapter books for readers aged 6 to 9, comprising 26 books published from 1997 through 2005. The series is written by Ron Roy, with interior illustrations and original cover art by John Steven Gurney, and redesigned cover art (2015) by Stephen Gilpin. In each book in the series, three kids named Dink, Josh, and Ruth Rose solve a mystery set in their fictional home town of Green Lawn, Connecticut (and sometimes in other locations in the USA). The average page length of the text of each book is approximately 80 to 90 pages.

Capital Mysteries 

The Capital Mysteries is a chapter book series for readers aged 6 to 9, comprising 14 books published from 2001 through 2012. The series is written by Ron Roy, with interior illustrations by Timothy Bush and cover art by Greg Swearingen. In each book in the series, two kids named KC and Marshall solve a mystery set in and around their home city of Washington, D.C. The plots often involve the president himself.

Calendar Mysteries 

The Calendar Mysteries is a chapter book series for first and second graders, comprising 13 books published from 2009 through 2014. The series is written by Ron Roy, with interior illustrations and cover art by John Steven Gurney. The main characters are cousins and younger siblings of Dink, Josh, and Ruth Rose from the A to Z Mysteries series. The average page length of the text of each book is approximately 65 pages.

A to Z Mysteries Super Editions 

The A to Z Mysteries Super Editions is a chapter book series for readers aged 6 to 9, published from 2006. The series is written by Ron Roy, with interior illustrations and cover art by John Steven Gurney. A continuation of the popular original A to Z Mysteries series (the final volume of which was published in 2005), the Super Editions follow Dink, Josh, and Ruth Rose as they travel to various locations around the US and solve mysteries. The average page length of the text of each book is approximately 130 pages.

Crime in the Crypt was released on July 6th 2021

References

External links
 

1940 births
American children's writers
Living people
Writers from Hartford, Connecticut
University of Connecticut alumni
University of Hartford alumni